Norman H. Lockhart (4 March 1924 – 19 August 1993) was a professional footballer from Northern Ireland. Lockhart played as an outside left for Linfield, Swansea Town, Coventry City, Aston Villa, Bury and Ards. He represented the Northern Ireland national football team eight times between 1946 and 1956.

Career statistics

Club

International

Honours

Club

Linfield

 Irish Cup Runner-up (1): 1943–44.
 Irish Cup Winner (2): 1944–45, 1945–56.
 Northern Regional League Champion (2): 1944–45, 1945–46.

Notes

References

External links
 British Pathe – Ireland vs. Scotland, Windsor Park, Belfast, 1953.
 British Pathe – England vs. Ireland, Goodison Park, Liverpool, 1953.
 British Pathe – Wales vs. Ireland, Ninian Park, Cardiff, 1956.

1924 births
1993 deaths
Association footballers from Northern Ireland
Association football outside forwards
Lisburn Distillery F.C. players
Linfield F.C. players
Swansea City A.F.C. players
Coventry City F.C. players
Aston Villa F.C. players
Bury F.C. players
Ards F.C. players
Ireland national football team (1882–1950)
Northern Ireland international footballers